Energy in Belize is based on four main sources: imported fossil fuels, biomass, hydro, and imported electricity.

Energy sources 
Belize currently imports 100% of its fossil fuel use (Launchpad Consulting, 2003).  Under the San Jose Pact, which Belize signed onto in 1988, Mexico and Venezuela signed a treaty obligating them to offer a concessionary credit from 20-25% of the purchase price of their oil exports.  In 1991, both countries increased the oil supply offered under this agreement (Belize – Mining and Energy Industry, 1992).  However, fuel prices had jumped to a record high in 2008, over $10 per gallon (Armageddon, 2008).

Since 1981, extensive drilling has occurred throughout Belize to find oil deposits.  Near Spanish Lookout and northwest of Belmopan, two oil fields were located.  Drilling in these two fields began in 2005 and was predicted to reach a peak by 2010 (Belize, 2010).

Sustainable energy 
Sustainable energy is the main goal for Belize.  In 2003, the Public Utilities Commission implemented a one-year project entitled Formulation for a National Energy Plan for Belize.  The project, funded by the United Nations Development Fund, developed a comprehensive National Energy Policy to promote environmentally sound, safe, reliable, affordable energy (National Energy Plan, 2001).  
In 2011 this plan was updated with the Framework for the National Energy Policy. The Ministry of Energy, Science & Technology, and Public Utilities was founded following recommendations from the framework.

Belize has also taken a role in reducing greenhouse gas emissions.  The Belize and Nicaragua Logs Recovery project aims to reduce greenhouse gas emissions and prevent deforestation by salvaging mahogany and other logs in the Belize and Nicaragua Rivers (Legace and Legault International Inc., 2007).

Also, in compliance with the United Nations’ program REDD, Reduction of Emissions from Deforestation and forest Degradation, a national workshop performing with the Ministry of Natural Resources and Environment and the Forest Department of Belize are coordinating efforts to forest management and reduction of deforestation (Protecting Belize and other Central American Countries – Reducing Emissions:  REDD, 2010).  Along with signing the San Jose Pact, Belize has also been a participant to the Kyoto Protocol.

References
 Armaggedon (2008).  Energy Crisis in Belize?  What Will GOB Do?  Is There a Plan?  Koncas.  	Retrieved from https://web.archive.org/web/20110713164248/http://www.koncas.com/energy-crisis-in-belize-what-will-gob-do-is-there-a-plan
 Background Note:  Belize (2010).  U.S. Department of State. 
 Belize (2010).  Energy Files.  Retrieved from http://www.energyfiles.com/americas/belize.html
 Belize – Mining and Energy Industry (1992).  Mongabay.  Retrieved from 	http://www.mongabay.com/history/belize/belize-mining_and_energy_industry.html
 Launchpad Consulting (2003).  Energy for Sustainable Development Toward a National Energy 		Strategy for Belize.  Retrieved from 	https://web.archive.org/web/20110304122733/http://www.puc.bz/publications/energy%20sector%20diagnostic%20report%20final.pdf
 Legace and Legault International Inc (2007).  Belize & Nicaragua Recovery Project.  Retrieved 	from http://www.ghgregistries.ca/files/projects/prj_8652_750.pdf
 National Energy Plan (2001).  Public Utilities Commission.  Retrieved from 	https://web.archive.org/web/20110706163840/http://www.puc.bz/nep.asp
 Protecting Belize and other Central American Countries – Reducing Emissions:  REDD.  	Expatriate Blog, July 24, 2010.  Retrieved from http://www.expatbelize.com/expat-	blog/165-protecting-Belize-and-other-central-American-countries-reducing-emission-	redd.html